The Haraldskær Woman (or Haraldskjaer Woman) is the name given to a bog body of a woman preserved in a bog in Jutland, Denmark, and dating from about 490 BC (pre-Roman Iron Age). Workers found the body in 1835 while excavating peat on the Haraldskær Estate. The anaerobic conditions and acids of the peat bog contributed to the body's excellent preservation. Not only was the intact skeleton found, but so were the skin and internal organs. Scientists settled disputes about the age and identity of this well preserved body in 1977, when radiocarbon dating determined conclusively that the woman's death occurred around the 5th century BC.

The Haraldskær Woman's body is on permanent display in a glass-covered sarcophagus inside The Cultural Museum in central Vejle, Denmark.

Details

Excavators found the body of the Haraldskær Woman in a supine position in an excellent state of preservation. She was naked and her clothes, consisting of a leather cape and three woolen garments, had been placed on top of her. Hurdles of branches and wooden poles pinned the body down. The complete skin envelope and the internal organs were both intact. The body had a lancing wound to the knee joint area, where some object (possibly one of the sharp poles) penetrated to some depth. Her skin was deeply bronzed with a robust skin tone due to tannins in the peat, and all the body joints were preserved with overlying skin in a state as if she had died only recently. Doctors determined she had been about 50 years old when she died and in good health without signs of degenerative diseases (such as arthritis) which are typically found in human remains of that age.

In 1979, doctors at Århus Hospital undertook a further forensic examination of the Haraldskær Woman. By this time, the body had desiccated, shrunken, and the skin was leathery, severely wrinkled and folded. A CT-scan of the cranium more accurately determined her age to be about 40 at the time of her death.

In 2000, Lone Hvass of the Elsinore Museum, Miranda Aldhouse-Green of Cardiff University, and the Department of Forensic Science at the University of Århus performed a re-examination of the Haraldskær Woman. Forensic analysis revealed stomach contents of unhusked millet and blackberries. Her neck had a faint groove as if someone applied a rope for torture or strangulation. The scientists concluded bog acids caused the swelling of the knee joint and that the woman was probably already dead before the branches pinned her down. Because of her careful placement, and since cremation was the prevailing mode of interment during that period in Jutland, the examiners guess the Haraldskær Woman was a victim of ritual sacrifice.

Relation to other bog bodies
The principal locations where bog bodies have been discovered are the Northern European countries of Germany, the Netherlands, the United Kingdom, Ireland, and especially Denmark. The oldest of these bodies dates to about 8000 BCE, although the majority of specimens in Denmark are from the Pre-Roman Iron Age to Roman Iron Age era (about 500 BC to 400 CE). As of 2006, more than 700 ancient bodies have been discovered in these sites, although other estimates have placed the number in the thousands. It is difficult for scientists to ascertain a precise number because many of the bodies have been lost or destroyed. Before archaeologists began actively searching for bog bodies, the bodies were discovered mostly during the routine extraction of peat, and then reburied or discarded. After the discovery that systematic conservation of Iron Age bodies was attributable to the acidic anaerobic environs, major excavations have occurred in Jutland. Other bog bodies recovered on the Jutland peninsula that have undergone as extensive an analysis as the Haraldskær Woman include Tollund Man, Grauballe Man, Elling Woman, Huldremose Woman and the Borremose Woman.

Mistaken identity 
After the discovery of the body, early theories of her identity centered on the persona of Queen Gunnhild of Norway, who lived around 900–1000 CE. Most of the bog bodies recovered indicate the victim died from a violent murder or ritualistic sacrifice. These theories are consistent with the body being put into a bog as opposed to burial in dry earth.

According to the Jomsvikinga Saga, Harald Bluetooth of Denmark ordered Queen Gunnhild be drowned in a bog. Based upon the belief of her royal personage, King Frederick VI of Denmark-Norway commanded an elaborately carved sarcophagus to hold her body.

This careful treatment of the Haraldskær Woman's remains explains the excellent state of conservation of the corpse; conversely, Tollund Man, a later discovery, was not properly conserved and most of the body has been lost, leaving only the head as original remains in his display.

In 1842, the young Danish archaeologist J. J. A. Worsaae disputed the identification of the Haraldskær Woman with Gunnhild. A pioneer in archaeological stratigraphy, Worsaae presented evidence the Haraldskær Woman dated from the Iron Age. Later radiocarbon dating confirmed the body was not Gunnhild, but rather a woman of the early Iron Age who lived about 490 BCE.

Literary references 
Danish author Steen Steensen Blicher, an amateur archaeologist and one of the first to visit the site, made the first literary reference to the Haraldskær Woman. In 1836, he published his novella Gravhøjen which was a parody about a mistaken archaeological find. However, by 1841 Blicher seemed to have changed his mind about the Haraldskær Woman's identity when he wrote the poem Dronning Gunhild, a lament for the dead queen in the bog. In 1846, the Danish playwright Jens Christian Hostrup wrote his comedy, A Sparrow Doing a Crane Dance, (En Spurv i Tranedans), in which the ghost of Queen Gunnhild gives a magical ring to a scheming tailor and makes everyone blind to his actions. Hostrup's play indirectly satirized the theory that the Haraldskær Woman was Queen Gunnhild, and became the first major public endorsement of Worsaae’s hypothesis.

See also

Bog body
Borremose bodies
Clonycavan Man
Grauballe Man
Lindow Man
Lindow Woman
Old Croghan Man 
Tollund Man
Weerdinge Men
Windeby I
Yde Girl

References

Further reading

External links
Tales from the Bog, illuminations magazine, University of California, Berkeley
Bog-bodies-links A collection of links to bog body articles at Stefan's Florilegium
The Perfect Corpse Nova series for PBS television, 2008

5th-century BC deaths
5th-century BC women
1835 archaeological discoveries
Ancient European women
Archaeological discoveries in Denmark
Bog bodies
Germanic archaeological artifacts
Pre-Roman Iron Age
Year of birth unknown